He Is Christmas, released in 1991 on Reprise Records, is the 1st Christmas album by the American contemporary gospel music group Take 6. It won the 34th annual Grammy Award for Best Jazz Vocal Performance, Duo or Group in 1991.

Track listing
 "Silent Night"
 "Oh! He Is Christmas"
 "Hark! The Herald Angels Sing"
 "Away in a Manger"
 "Amen"
 "The Little Drummer Boy"
 "'Twas da Nite"
 "Sweet Little Jesus Boy"
 "God Rest Ye Merry Gentlemen" (with the Yellowjackets)
 "O Come, All Ye Faithful"

References

1991 Christmas albums
Christmas albums by American artists
Take 6 albums
Gospel Christmas albums
Grammy Award for Best Jazz Vocal Album
Reprise Records albums